Players and pairs who neither have high enough rankings nor receive wild cards may participate in a qualifying tournament held one week before the annual Wimbledon Tennis Championships.

Seeds

  Éric Winogradsky (second round)
  Dan Cassidy (first round)
  Sammy Giammalva (qualified)
  Matt Anger (qualifying competition, lucky loser)
  Martin Laurendeau (qualified)
  Zeeshan Ali (qualified)
  Danilo Marcelino (qualifying competition)
  Grant Connell (second round)
  Udo Riglewski (first round)
  Niclas Kroon (second round)
  Broderick Dyke (second round)
  Nicklas Kulti (qualifying competition)
  Kelly Jones (qualified)
  Andrei Olhovskiy (first round)
  Peter Nyborg (first round)
  Joey Rive (qualified)
  Guillaume Raoux (first round)
  Cyril Suk (second round)
  Tobias Svantesson (qualifying competition)
 n/a
  Ricardo Acuña (first round)
  Kent Kinnear (qualifying competition)
  Bret Garnett (qualified)
  Michael Robertson (qualified)
  Philippe Pech (first round)
  Steve Guy (qualifying competition)
  Alexandre Hocevar (first round)
  Fernando Roese (qualifying competition)
  Peter Doohan (second round)
  Scott Warner (qualified)
  Patrick Baur (qualified)
  Srinivasan Vasudevan (first round)

Qualifiers

  Patrick Baur
  Ronnie Båthman
  Sammy Giammalva
  Scott Warner
  Martin Laurendeau
  Zeeshan Ali
  Greg Holmes
  Bill Scanlon
  Bret Garnett
  Michael Robertson
  Todd Woodbridge
  Bryan Shelton
  Kelly Jones
  Henrik Holm
  Nick Fulwood
  Joey Rive

Lucky loser
  Matt Anger

Qualifying draw

First qualifier

Second qualifier

Third qualifier

Fourth qualifier

Fifth qualifier

Sixth qualifier

Seventh qualifier

Eighth qualifier

Ninth qualifier

Tenth qualifier

Eleventh qualifier

Twelfth qualifier

Thirteenth qualifier

Fourteenth qualifier

Fifteenth qualifier

Sixteenth qualifier

External links

 1989 Wimbledon Championships – Men's draws and results at the International Tennis Federation

Men's Singles Qualifying
Wimbledon Championship by year – Men's singles qualifying